Raj Bhavan (translation: Government House) is the official residence of the governor of Rajasthan. It is located in the capital city of Jaipur, Rajasthan. The present governor of Rajasthan is Kalraj Mishra.

See also
 Government Houses of the British Indian Empire

References

External links
 Website

Governors' houses in India
Government of Rajasthan
Buildings and structures in Jaipur